Radar Kumeh (also Romanized as Rādār Kūmeh; also known as Rādār Khūmeh) is a village in Chaf Rural District, in the Central District of Langarud County, Gilan Province, Iran. At the 2006 census, its population was 306, in 87 families.

References 

Populated places in Langarud County